The National Stadium (Urdu: نیشنل سٹیڈیم), also referred to as National Bank Cricket Arena for sponsorship reasons, is a cricket stadium in Karachi, Pakistan, owned by the Pakistan Cricket Board. It is the home ground of Karachi Kings and Karachi's many other domestic cricket teams. It is the Second largest cricket stadium in Pakistan with a capacity of 34,228 spectators. It was built in early 1950s under the supervision of senior civil engineer Mr. Abdul Rasheed Khan (WP) and Mr. Kafiluddin (EP), was formally inaugurated in April 1955. In October 2022, the National Bank of Pakistan and the PCB agreed to a five-year naming-rights agreement, and resulted in the Stadium's new title, National Bank Cricket Arena.

The Pakistan cricket team have a remarkable Test record at the ground, having only lost twice in 45 Test matches (vs. England, December 2000–01, and South Africa, October 2007–08). The stadium has witnessed several memorable moments, such as Viv Richards 181 against Sri Lanka at the 1987 Cricket World Cup, Mohammad Yousuf's record ninth century of the year to break Viv Richards' record of most runs in a calendar year, and Kamran Akmal's famous century against India on a very difficult pitch in 2006, after Pakistan had collapsed to 39 for 6, as part of a memorable come-from-behind victory.

History

The stadium was established in April 1955. At that time, Karachi was the capital of Pakistan, but the only cricket ground was the one at the Karachi Gymkhana which had limited seating capacity. A plan was formulated to develop a new stadium for which a plot of land measuring 174.5 acres was acquired by the Pakistan Public Works Department through the Commissioner of Karachi.

The inaugural first-class match was played at NSK between Pakistan and India on 20–24 April 1955, and it became a fortress of Pakistan cricket. In 34 Tests between that first match and December 2000, Pakistan won 17 and were never beaten. They lost their first Test on the ground against England in 2000–01.

In November 1989, Sachin Tendulkar and Waqar Younis played their first test match in this stadium.

The first ODI at the National Stadium was against West Indies on 21 November 1980, and it went down to the last ball as Gordon Greenidge drove Imran Khan imperiously to the cover boundary with three needed. It has been a far less successful limited-overs venue, with defeats outnumbering victories. In fact, in a little under five years from the start of 1996, Pakistan failed to win on the ground. It also staged a quarter-final match in the 1996 World Cup.

A 75 meter long, 44 meter wide screen was installed at the ground in 2007 at a cost of Rs. 7 million.

In September 2019, the Pakistan Cricket Board named it as one of the venues to host matches in the 2019–20 Quaid-e-Azam Trophy.

In October 2022, the Pakistan Cricket Board renamed the stadium from National Stadium Karachi to the National Bank Cricket Arena after signing a successful deal with the National Bank of Pakistan (NBP) for 5 years. This was the first naming-rights deal for a stadium in Pakistan. According to the agreement, the NBP will be permitted to utilize the venue's signs and nomenclature outside of the playing area.

Return of international cricket 
PCB Chairman Najam Sethi announced in 2017 that Karachi's National Stadium will host the final match of 2018 Pakistan Super League on 25 March 2018. The stadium's dressing rooms and VIP boxes were renovated for the final, along with the pitch and outfield. Around 800 CCTV cameras and several elevators were also installed. Around Rs. 1.5 billion was spent on this renovation, which was being done for the first time since the 1996 Cricket World Cup.

The historic match, which was played between Islamabad United and Peshawar Zalmi, saw the return of international stars to National Stadium after a gap of nine years, ended up being relatively one-sided, as the 2016 champions Islamabad United were crowned champions once again. The match was the first major cricket event since 2009 in the port city and it was highly welcomed by crowds and the stadium witnessed packed house for the big game. In order to make it a successful event, many security forces were deployed in and around the stadium to maintain the law and order situation, by their efforts the event was held successfully.

In 2017, PCB Chairman had announced that West Indies would tour Pakistan for 3 match T20I series which were scheduled to be played in Lahore, the fixtures were to be played in November 2017. However, early in November 2017, reports announced that the West Indies team would not be travelling to Pakistan over security concerns. The Pakistan Cricket Board (PCB) chairman Najam Sethi stated that the original schedule was changed due to unforeseen weather, logistic issues and challenges with security. In March 2018, the PCB confirmed that the fixtures would take place in April at the National Stadium in Karachi after the conclusion of PSL 2018. The last time an international cricket match was played at the venue in Karachi was in February 2009, when Sri Lanka toured Pakistan. That series was cut short, following an 2009 attack on the Sri Lanka national cricket team.

It was the first tour in Pakistan of more than one match against another Test nation since Zimbabwe toured in May 2015.

Sri Lanka vs Pakistan (2019) 

In May 2019, at the Asian Cricket Council (ACC) meeting in Singapore, the Pakistan Cricket Board (PCB) made a request to Sri Lanka Cricket (SLC) to play the two Test matches in Pakistan. In July 2019, the SLC sent a security expert to assess the situation in Pakistan, with Sri Lanka Cricket saying they were "likely" to play a Test match in the country. A further decision was taken by Sri Lanka after a security delegation inspects venues in Lahore and Karachi in early August 2019. The delegation gave Sri Lanka Cricket "very positive feedback", suggesting that Sri Lanka could be open to playing a Test match in Pakistan. On 22 August 2019, Sri Lanka's Sports Minister confirmed their agreement to play a three-match ODI and T20I series in Pakistan in October, but ruled out playing any Test matches. On 23 August, PCB announced dates for the ODI and T20I series. Sri Lanka were to play three match ODI series at National Stadium, starting from 27 September. This was supposed be the first time since 21 January 2009 that an ODI match will be held at National Stadium. But, the first ODI match was abandoned due to heavy rain. It was the first time that an ODI match at the venue had been washed out. As a result, the Pakistan Cricket Board (PCB) rescheduled the second ODI match, moving it back one day to 30 September 2019, to allow the ground staff more time to prepare the outfield. As a result, the National Stadium had to wait for few more days to host an ODI match.

In October 2019, the PCB proposed hosting the two Test matches in Pakistan, instead of the UAE, at venues in Rawalpindi and Karachi. Sri Lanka Cricket said that they were "very positive" with regards to the progress of playing Test cricket in Pakistan. In November 2019, PCB confirmed the dates and venues for the Test series. National Stadium hosted the second test match, starting from 19 December.

Records

Test 
 Highest team total: 765/6d, by Pakistan against Sri Lanka in 2009.
 Lowest team total: 80, by Australia against Pakistan in 1956.
 Highest partnership: 437, by Mahela Jayawardene and Thilan Samaraweera against Pakistan in 2010.

One Day International 
 Highest team total: 374/4, by India against Hong Kong, 25 June 2008.
 Highest run chase (Won or Loss) 288/5 by Pakistan against India, 13 March 2004.
 Lowest team total: 115, by Bangladesh against Pakistan, 4 July 2008.
 Highest run chase achieved: 310/4, by India against Sri Lanka, 3 July 2008.
 Highest individual score: 181, by Viv Richards against Sri Lanka, 13 October 1987.
 Highest partnership: 201, by Sanath Jayasuriya and Kumar Sangakkara against Bangladesh, 30 June 2008.

T20 International 

 Highest team total: 221/3 by England against Pakistan, 23 September 2022.

 Lowest team total: 60/9 by West Indies against Pakistan, 1 April 2018.
 Highest individual score: 110* by Babar Azam against England, 22 September 2022.
 Highest partnership: 203*, by Babar Azam and Mohammad Rizwan against England, 22 September 2022.

Cricket World Cup

1987 Cricket World Cup

1996 Cricket World Cup

See also
 List of Test cricket grounds
 List of international cricket centuries at the National Stadium
 List of international five-wicket hauls at the National Stadium
 List of stadiums by capacity
 List of stadiums in Pakistan
 List of cricket grounds in Pakistan
 List of sports venues in Karachi
 List of sports venues in Lahore
 List of sports venues in Faisalabad

References

External links
Cricinfo.com ground profile
Ground Profile – PCB.com
List of all Test matches played at National Stadium, Karachi
List of all ODI matches played at National Stadium, Karachi

Test cricket grounds in Pakistan
Cricket
Stadiums in Pakistan
Pakistan
Stadiums in Karachi
Cricket grounds in Pakistan
1955 establishments in Pakistan
Cricket in Karachi
1987 Cricket World Cup stadiums
1996 Cricket World Cup stadiums